In mathematics, the Doi–Naganuma lifting is a map from elliptic modular forms to Hilbert modular forms of a real quadratic field, introduced by  and .
It was a precursor of the base change lifting.

It is named for Japanese mathematicians Kōji Doi (土井公二） and Hidehisa Naganuma (長沼英久).

See also

Saito–Kurokawa lift, a similar lift to Siegel modular forms

References

Modular forms